Augerville  may refer to:

Places
 Augerville, Illinois, United States
 Augerville, a neighborhood of Hamden, Connecticut, United States
 Château d'Augerville, France
 Augerville-la-Rivière, France